The Kuala Lumpur Library is the main library of Kuala Lumpur, Malaysia. It has 15 branches around Kuala Lumpur :

 Pustaka KL @ Taman Tun Dr Ismail
 Pustaka KL @ Medan Idaman
 Pustaka KL @ Lembah Pantai
 Pustaka KL @ Muhibbah
 Pustaka KL @ Bandar Baru Sentul
 Pustaka KL @ Pudu Sentral (Currently Closed)
 Pustaka KL @ Setiawangsa
 Pustaka KL @ Bandar Tun Razak
 Pustaka KL @ Desa Tun Razak
 Pustaka KL @ Gombak Setia
 Pustaka KL @ Sri Sabah
 Pustaka KL @ Sri Pantai
 Pustaka KL @ Jelatek
 Pustaka KL @ IDB (For DBKL Staff only)
 Pustaka KL @ Keramat

History
The museum building was constructed in 1898 to a design by A.C. Norman and J. Riddell; It was initially a government printing office for the British administration in Malaya. The building was then refurbished in 1989.

Collections
The library consists of various books ranging from monograph, business, economy, music, art, magazines, newspapers, references, etc.

Facilities
The library is also equipped with auditorium, multipurpose hall and meeting rooms.

Transportation
The library is accessible within walking distance south west of Masjid Jamek LRT Station.

See also
 List of tourist attractions in Kuala Lumpur
 National Library of Malaysia

References

External links

 

Buildings and structures in Kuala Lumpur
Tourist attractions in Kuala Lumpur
Public libraries in Malaysia
1989 establishments in Malaysia